El Avion de Las Tres is the first single by the Mexican music group AK-7 from their debut Album El Avion De Las Tres. The song was launched in September 2007. It reached Number 46 on the U.S. Billboard Hot Latin Songs.

References

External links
 El Avion De Las Tres Music Video

AK-7 songs
2007 songs